Kekezović is a Serbian surname. It may refer to:

Dejan Kekezović (born 1982), Serbian footballer
Marinko Kekezović (born 1985), Serbian handballer

See also
Kekez, surname

Serbian surnames